The Lynchburg Titans are a franchise of the Premier Basketball League which began play in the 2011-12 season.  Based in Lynchburg, Virginia, they play their home games in Downtown Lynchburg at the Lynchburg City Armory.

The Titans competed in the American Basketball Association for two seasons, during which they were known as the Lynchburg Legends. As of October 18, 2013, the Legends debuted in the league's pre-season rankings at #21, the first time the Legends have appeared in the rankings.

The Titans will begin play in the PBL for the 2014 season.

References

External links

Former Premier Basketball League teams
Basketball teams in Virginia
Sports in Lynchburg, Virginia
Basketball teams established in 2010
2011 establishments in Virginia